Leptochilichthys is a genus of marine smelts containing four species. Leptochilichthys is the only genus in the former family  Leptochilichthyidae but is now included within the broader family Alepocephalidae.

Its name derives from the Greek λεπτός (leptos, "small"); χεῖλος (cheilos, "lip"); and ἰχθύς (ichthys, "fish").

Species
The currently recognized species in this genus are:
 Leptochilichthys agassizii (Garman, 1899) (Agassiz' smooth-head)
 Leptochilichthys microlepis (Machida & Shiogaki, 1988) (smallscale smooth-head)
 Leptochilichthys pinguis (Vaillant, 1886) (Vaillant's smooth-head)

Description
Species in genus Leptochilichthys have toothless maxillae. The maxillae are considered especially long  There are teeth on the palate and dentary. Many long gill rakers are also present. This genus does not exhibit any shoulder sac apparatus. Thirteen branchiostegal rays support the gill membranes behind the lower jaw. There may be 11 to 21 dorsal fin rays, and 11–18 anal fin rays. These species have 47–64 lateral line scales. Species of this genus have between 47 and 58 vertebrae.

Distribution and habitat 
Leptochilichthys species are found in deep sea regions in the eastern Atlantic, western Indian, and eastern and western Pacific Oceans.

Some species in this genus, particularly L. agassizii, may be bathypelagic.

References

Argentiniformes